Aeridostachya acuminata, synonym Eria acuminata, is a species of plant within the orchid family.

References

acuminata